The 2019 Charlotte 49ers football team represented the University of North Carolina at Charlotte in the 2019 NCAA Division I FBS football season. The 49ers played their home games at Jerry Richardson Stadium in Charlotte, NC, and competed in the East Division of Conference USA (C–USA). They were led by first-year head coach Will Healy.

Previous season
The 49ers finished the 2018 season 5–7, 4–4 in C-USA play to finish in fourth place in the East Division.

Coaching staff
Following the loss of the final home game of the 2018 season to FIU and elimination from bowl game contention, first-year athletic director Mike Hill released head coach Brad Lambert from his contract. Lambert finished the season and his Charlotte 49ers career with a road victory against FAU the following Saturday. On December 5, 2018 Austin Peay third-year head coach Will Healy was introduced as the Charlotte 49ers second head football coach.

On December 21 Austin Peay's Defensive coordinator Brandon Cooper was named Co-defensive coordinator and safeties coach. Also coming over on the same date from Austin Peay was Max Thurmond who would take over the same positions of special teams coordinator and linebackers coach. Virginia State offensive coordinator Mark Carrey was named quarterbacks coach. Southern Miss cornerbacks coach Eddie Hicks would take the same position on Healy's new staff. Carter Crutchfield would also follow Healy from Austin Peay to continue as his recruiting coordinator and director of operations. Rounding out the first round of staff hires would be Chris Laskowski, who maintained the same position he had under Healy at Austin Peay of strength and conditioning coach.

On December 23 Tulane assistant head coach, offensive coordinator and offensive line coach Alex Atkins was named offensive coordinator and offensive line coach. On January 8, 2019 Minnesota Defensive line coach Marcus West was reported as taking the same position with the 49ers and also joining Cooper as Co-defensive coordinators. In addition Healy named West, who had previously been on Healy's staff at Austin Peay, to Assistant head coach. On the same date 
Troy Runningbacks coach Sean Dawkins was named Runningbacks coach and Run game coordinator.

On January 28, Western Kentucky Runningbacks coach Montario Hardesty joined the staff to coach Wide receivers. On February 21 Clemson graduate assistant Zachary Alley joined the staff to coach Nicklebacks. On March 1 Oregon graduate assistant Cody Woodiel was hired to coach Tight ends, completing Healy's first coaching staff at Charlotte.

Alley would depart from the staff shortly after his hire to join the Boise State staff as Inside linebackers coach.

On June 24 Asheville’s Christ School’s head football coach Tommy Langford accepted the Nicklebacks assistant coaching position.

Recruiting

Position key

Recruiting class

The following recruits have signed letters of intent or verbally committed to the Charlotte 49ers football program for the 2019 recruiting year.

Key Transfers

Players

Roster

Depth chart

Awards and honors

Preseason

In season

Postseason

All Conference Honorable Mentions:

Offense:
QB – Chris Reynolds, R-So. • 
WR – Victor Tucker, R-So.

Defense:
DE – Markees Watts, So. • 
LB – Jeff Gemmell, R-Sr. • 
DB – Nafees Lyon, R-Sr.

2020 East–West Shrine Bowl:

Participants:
RB - Benny LeMay (Shrine Game MVP) •
OL - Cameron Clark •
DE - Alex Highsmith

Schedule

Television

Charlotte 49ers home games and conference road games will be broadcast through Conference USA's television partners ESPN, CBS Sports, Stadium, NFL Network, and Facebook Watch. Additional games will be available locally in the Charlotte TV market on WCCB.

Radio

Radio coverage for all games is broadcast by IMG College through the Charlotte 49ers Radio Network flagship station WZGV ESPN Radio 730 AM The Game, and the TuneIn Charlotte 49ers IMG Sports Network app. The radio announcers are "Voice of the 49ers" Matt Swierad with play-by-play alongside NFL veteran Al Wallace providing color commentary and Bobby Rosinski and Walker Mehl with sideline reports. Swierad also hosts the "Niners Live" Coaches Show each Monday during the season at 7:00 pm from Cabarrus Brewing Company.

Preseason media poll

Conference USA released their preseason media poll on July 16, 2019, with the 49ers predicted to finish in last place in the East Division.

Game summaries

Gardner–Webb Runnin' Bulldogs

Sources:

Healy made his debut as head coach of the 49ers on August 29 against another former Austin Peay head coach in Gardner–Webb's Carroll McCray. The 49ers recorded a 49-28 victory in Will Healy's first game as their head coach.

Top performers included Charlotte quarterback Chris Reynolds who passed for 136 yards, a touchdown, and an interception. Charlotte's Benny LeMay had 16 carries for 120 yards and 2 touchdowns. Charlotte's Cameron Dollar had 5 receptions for 58 yards.

Game notes:

This game marked the highest scoring total in Charlotte's FBS era.
Ben DeLuca's 3rd quarter fumble recovery moved him into the all-time lead for the 49ers with six fumble recoveries.
Alex Highsmith's two sacks moved him into second place on the 49ers sack list with eight career sacks behind Larry Ogunjobi's thirteen career sacks. 
5 team sacks tied the program's single-game record.

Appalachian State Mountaineers

Sources:

This was the 49ers' first visit to Boone, NC. After not scoring a touchdown in the previous matchup between these squads the 49ers would manage to keep the game within a two-score margin for the entire high-scoring contest. Charlotte would manage to control the clock and have the overall yardage lead but could never crack Appalachian States' score lead throughout the game

Top performers included Charlotte quarterback Chris Reynolds who passed for 296 yards, 4 touchdowns, and an interception. App. St.'s  Darrynton Evans had 19 carries for 234 yards and 3 touchdowns. Appalachian's Jalen Virgil had 3 receptions for 86 yards and 2 touchdowns.

Game notes:

Charlotte put up over 500 yards (526) of total offense for the second time in the season.
Chris Reynolds would set both a new school FBS single-game passing yardage (296 yards) and touchdown (4) record in this game.
First time Charlotte has scored 6 touchdowns against an FBS opponent on the road.
First time Charlotte has scored 4 passing touchdowns against an FBS opponent.
Charlotte is the first opponent to score more than 19 points in a game against App. St. in Boone since 2017.
Charlotte's 41 points are the most points scored against App. St. in Boone since Miami beat them at home 45-10 in 2016.

Massachusetts Minutemen

Sources:

Charlotte gained some revenge for last year's first quarter four touchdown lapse when they scored three touchdowns unanswered in the first quarter and a fourth early in the second. Charlotte would dominate the rest of the game in similar fashion to gain the program's first home out of conference FBS victory, and only the second FBS out of conference win.

Top performances were dominated by Charlotte and included quarterback Chris Reynolds who passed for 155 yards and 2 touchdowns. Running back Benny LeMay had 16 carries for 113 yards. Receiver Tyler Ringwood had 2 receptions for 46 yards and 2 touchdowns.

Game notes:

52 points are the most the 49ers have scored against an FBS opponent.
This is the first time the 49ers have scored more than 40 points in 3 consecutive games.
35 points is Charlotte's largest margin of victory in an FBS game to date.
5 team sacks matched the program record for sacks in a game for the 2nd time this season.

#1 Clemson Tigers

Sources:

Charlotte visited "Death Valley" for the first time to meet the defending National Champions. The Tigers went up early and never looked back, cruising to a 52 to 10 home victory.

Top performances were dominated by Clemson and included quarterback Trevor Lawrence who passed for 94 yards and 2 touchdowns. Running back Travis Etienne had 11 carries for 61 yards and a touchdown. Receiver Joe Ngata had 3 receptions for 62 yards and a touchdown.

Game notes:

First time Charlotte has faced a defending national champion.
First time Charlotte has faced a #1 ranked opponent.
Alex Highsmith's sack in this game (5th on the season) has tied the previous season sack record held by Larry Ogunjobi.
Highsmith is 2 sacks (11 career) away from tying Ogunjobi's career sacks at 13.
Aaron McAllister became the 5th 49er to rush for over 1000 yards in his career.
Game scenes for the upcoming Disney movie "Safety" were filmed during halftime.

Florida Atlantic Owls

Sources:

Charlotte and Florida Atlantic both opened conference play in a rematch of the previous season finale. Florida Atlantic would get revenge for losing a chance at a bowl game the previous season by holding off two Niners rally attempts and stretching the lead out in the second half to comfortably win the game.

Top performers included FAU quarterback Chris Robison who passed for 312 yards, 2 touchdowns, and an interception. Florida Atlantic's Malcolm Davidson had 13 carries for 83 yards and 2 touchdowns. Charlotte's Victor Tucker had 6 receptions for 115 yards and a touchdown.

Game notes:

Chris Reynolds's tied Haasan Klugh's single Conference USA game passing touchdowns record at 3.
Alex Highsmith's sack in this game (6th on the season) broke the previous single-season sack record held by Larry Ogunjobi.
Highsmith is 1 sack (12 career) away from tying Ogunjobi's career sacks record at 13.

FIU Panthers

Sources:

Charlotte would lose control of the game early in the second quarter. Florida International broke the game open with 21 points to finish the half and followed up in the third quarter with two more touchdowns to put the game well out of the 49ers' reach.

Top performers included FIU quarterback James Morgan who passed for 160 yards and 2 touchdowns. The Panthers' Anthony Jones had 16 carries for 117 yards and 3 touchdowns. Charlotte's Benny LeMay had 4 receptions for 90 yards and a touchdown to add to his rushing stats of 21 carries for 144 yards and an additional touchdown.

Game notes:

Benny LeMay put up a career high 234 yards from scrimmage.
LeMay had his 4th 100 yard rushing game of the season.

WKU Hilltoppers

Sources:

The Hilltoppers would be Charlotte's third homecoming game in a row and their fourth straight loss. Though the game was competitive in the first half Charlotte couldn't find the endzones or the uprights in the second half.

Top performances were dominated by the Hilltoppers. Quarterback Ty Storey threw for 283 yards and two touchdowns. Rusher Geaj Walker had 21 carries for 70 yards. Receiver Lucky Jackson had five receptions for 141 yards and a touchdown.

Game notes:

Alex Highsmith's two sacks in this game moved him into first place in career sacks (13.5 career). Breaking Larry Ogunjobi's previous career sacks record.
Highsmith now owns all the program sack records for the 49ers. Single game (2), single season (7.5) and career (13.5).
Victor Tucker became the 6th player in program history to reach 1,000 yards receiving.

North Texas Mean Green

Sources:

In this first ever meeting of conference foes the Mean Green took an early lead and held it throughout the game; but an offensive flurry for the 49ers in the fourth quarter, combined with the defense shutting down North Texas's high power offense in the same time period, resulted in the Niners gaining their first conference victory of the year.

Top performers of the game included North Texas's Mason Fine, who threw for 394 yards and 5 touchdowns. Charlotte's Benny LeMay rushed for 155 yards on 30 carries for 2 touchdowns. The Mean Green's Jyaire Shorter had 3 receptions for 111 yards and 3 touchdowns.

Game notes:

First game between these conference foes from opposite divisions.
Will Healy's first C-USA victory.
Charlotte set a new program record for total offense against an FBS opponent with 589 yards.
Chris Reynolds's 432 total yards of offense (336 passing, 96 rushing) broke the single game record for total yardage previously set by Matt Johnson (415 vs Gardner-Webb in 2013).
Reynolds was name C-USA Offensive Player of the Week.

Middle Tennessee Blue Raiders

Sources:

Middle Tennessee would get the first points, but Charlotte's defense wouldn't let them score again until the fourth quarter. By then it was too late, as the 49ers had a steady stream of scores in the first quarter and stretched the lead out enough to make the late Blue Raiders' rally fall far short.

Charlotte dominated the top performances with Chris Reynolds throwing for 192 yards and a touchdown while also adding a rushing touchdown behind 103 yards on the ground. Charlotte's Aaron McAllister would step in for the injured Benny LeMay with 24 carriers for 104 yards and 2 touchdowns. Charlotte's Cameron Dollar had 3 receptions for 80 yards.

Game notes:

Charlotte's first win in five tries against this C-USA East Division foe in the series. Charlotte has now defeated all C-USA East Division teams at least once save for Florida International.
First time Charlotte has won back-to-back FBS and conference home games.
Senior linebacker Jeff Gemmell would record 7 tackles in the game, making him the 49ers' all-time leading tackler with 269 tackles so far on his career, beating out the previous record of 267 tackles held by Karrington King.

UTEP Miners

Sources:

The Miners, looking for their first FBS and conference win of the season, would strike quickly by going up two touchdowns in the first quarter and taking a two score lead into the half. The 49ers would reverse the action in the second half, holding the Miners scoreless while coming from behind to take their first road victory of the year.

Chris Reynolds would have another outstanding performance, setting a new FBS school single game record with 354 passing yards which resulted in 2 touchdowns and an interception. With Benny LeMay still injured Reynolds would also add 18 carries for 91 yards on the ground to be the 49ers' top rusher. The Miners' QB Kai Locksley would be their top rusher today as well, having 15 carries for 84 yards and a touchdown. Charlotte's Cameron Dollar would grab 9 receptions for 157 yards.

Game Notes:

First game between these conference foes from opposite divisions.
First Charlotte 49ers game in the Mountain Time Zone.
First time Charlotte has won 3 FBS and conference games in a row.
First road victory for the program on the season.
Chris Reynolds set a new school single game FBS passing record of 354 yards, only 4 yards shy of the all-time single game passing yards record held by Matt Johnson.
Reynolds' 354 passing yards and 91 rushing yards would set a new single game total offensive yardage record of 445 total yards, setting a new mark over his own previously set record of 432 total yards set two weeks earlier against North Texas.
Reynolds also crossed the 2000 yards mark for the season and 3000 yards mark on his career.

Marshall Thundering Herd

Sources:

In a heavy rain the Thundering Herd, looking to secure home field for the C-USA Championship, would take an early lead; but the 49ers' defense would keep Marshall's offense from reaching the end zone for the entire game. Behind Quarterback Chris Reynolds the 49ers would stage a second half comeback victory to secure the program's first winning season and first bowl game qualification.

The 49ers' Chris Reynolds would dominate the passing and rushing stats in the game, getting a touchdown by both methods. He passed for 166 yards, a touchdown, and 2 interceptions. He rushed for 145 yards on 25 carries and another touchdown. Charlotte's Victor Tucker would make 5 receptions for 121 yards and a touchdown, plus rush for another touchdown.

Game notes:

The 49ers became bowl eligible for the first time.
First time the program had 4 victories in a row.
Tied the number of conference victories in a season at 4.
Set a new school record for home wins at 5.
Tied school record with 3rd straight home win.
Chris Reynolds would move into 2nd place for program career passing yards with 3373 career yards.
Benny LeMay, returning from injury, would record his 13th career game with 100 yards or more.
LeMay would also become the 2nd 49er to rush for 3000 yards (3082 yards) in his career, only behind Kalif Phillips (4020 yards).
Cam Clark would tie the consecutive games played mark with his 47th game.
Victor Tucker was named Conference USA Offensive Player of the Week.

Old Dominion Monarchs (Khedive Shriners Oyster Bowl)

Sources:

Charlotte would come into Norfolk looking to secure their first winning season in program history and a spot in a bowl game. Charlotte would cruise to a relatively easy win over the struggling Monarchs and prepare for their first ever game past the month of November.

Charlotte dominated the top performances of the game with Chris Reynolds passing for 166 yards, two touchdowns and an interception. Benny LeMay would rush on 18 carries for 105 yards and two touchdowns. Victor Tucker had 3 receptions for 118 yards and a touchdown.

Game notes:

Charlotte's first Oyster Bowl.
First winning season in program history.
First five game winning streak in program history.
Set a new conference victory total with 5 wins.
Benny LeMay secured his 2nd 1000 yard rushing season of his career.
Chris Reynolds tied the season passing touchdown mark set by Matt Johnson at 21 touchdowns.
Victor Tucker became the 49ers all-time leader in FBS reception yards.
Alex Highsmith set 2 single game records with 4.5 sacks and 5 tackles for loss.
Highsmith was named Oyster Bowl MVP.
Highsmith was named C-USA Defensive Player of the Week.
Jeff Gemmell, the 49ers' all-time leader in tackles, became the first 49er with 300 career tackles.
Cam Clark became the first 49er to play in a record setting 48 games.

Buffalo Bulls (Makers Wanted Bahamas Bowl)

Sources:

High winds encouraged both teams to keep things on the ground early but it was the Bulls that were able to score first and most often behind their powerful dual threat running game. The 49ers would have two costly drive stalling first half penalties and two costly turnovers at key moments of the game. The 49ers would finally score in the second half, but the game was out of reach as the Bulls took home their first bowl trophy in their fourth bowl appearance.

Top performers of the game included Charlotte quarterback Chris Reynolds, who threw for 198 yards with a touchdown and an interception. Buffalo rusher Jaret Patterson would have 32 carries for 173 yards and 2 touchdowns. Bulls' receiver Antonio Nunn had 5 receptions for 53 yards and a touchdown.

Game notes:

First Bowl game in program history.
First international game in program history.
First time the team played a 13th game in a season.
First December game in program history.
Chris Reynolds touchdown pass to Victor Tucker was his 22nd of the season and broke the single season passing touchdown record held by Matt Johnson from the 2013 Inaugural Season.
All-time 49ers' leading tackler Jeff Gemmell would finish his career with 306 tackles.
Alex Highsmith finished his career with a school record 20 sacks.
Cam Clark became the first 49er to play in his 49th game, and appropriately wore the #49 jersey in his final game.

Attendance

Players drafted into the NFL

References

Charlotte
Charlotte 49ers football seasons
Charlotte 49ers football